Thekla (Thékla) is a Greek feminine given name made famous by Saint Thecla, a 1st-century Christian martyr. In English, it is more commonly romanized as Thecla.

In modern Russian language it is known as Fekla and considered to be an obsolete name following the Great October Revolution.

Thekla may also refer to:

People
 Thekla, wife of Michael II (died ), first Empress-consort of Michael II of the Byzantine Empire
 Thekla, daughter of Theophilos ( – after 867), daughter of Emperor Theophilos of the Byzantine Empire, Augusta
 Mother Thekla (1918–2011), nun, academic and collaborator of the English musician and composer John Tavener
 Thekla Beere (1902–1991), Irish civil servant
 Thekla M. Bernays (1856–1931), American author, journalist, artist, art collector, speaker, and suffragette
 Thekla Brun-Lie (born 1992), Norwegian biathlete
 Thekla Kaischauri (born 1993), Austrian professional wrestler known mononymously as Thekla
 Thekla Knös (1817–1880), Swedish poet
 Thekla Krause (born 1969), German footballer
 Thekla Resvoll (1871–1948), Norwegian botanist and educator
 Thekla Reuten (born 1975), Dutch actress
 Thekla Schild (1890–1991), German architect
 Thekla Carola Wied (born 1944), German actress

Other
 The Thekla (Old Profanity Showboat), originally a cargo ship, now a music venue in Bristol, England
 Thekla, suburb in Leipzig, site of a subcamp of Buchenwald
 Thekla lark, species of lark
 Thekla, Inc., a game development company created by Jonathan Blow
 "Thekla: Eine Geisterstimme" poem by Schiller, set to music by (among others) Schubert
 one of the 55 cities described in the novel Invisible Cities by Italo Calvino

See also
 
 

 Thecla (disambiguation)
 Thelma (disambiguation)
 Tekla (given name)
 Tecla
 Tekla, software company
 Takla (disambiguation)

Scandinavian feminine given names
Norwegian feminine given names
Swedish feminine given names
German feminine given names